Lawrence John Rivera (born in 1971 in the USA) is an American citizen, door-to-door salesman and convicted murderer sentenced to life imprisonment on March 11, 2011. He fled the United States before his capture to Amsterdam and Australia where he was arrested in August 2002. He fought extradition until 2008, when he was escorted back to the United States to face the charges.

Rivera murdered his co-worker and boss Kristina Garcia in 2002. Garcia's unburied body was found in the open desert off of Yermo Cutoff Road on May 22, 2002, six days after her disappearance. Rivera, who had a brief relationship with Garcia, fled overseas to England, Germany, the Netherlands, and Australia, before he could be arrested and extradited in 2008 after years of appeals. U.S authorities discovered Rivera had fled the U.S in May 2002 after being questioned about the disappearance of Kristina Garcia. Rivera thought no one would find him when he fled to Australia.

Rivera tied up the Australian legal system, cost the government thousands and used police resources before his extradition by a team of eight U.S Marshals on a private plane in 2008. In December 2007, Rivera attacked guards, spat on TV crews and passengers, and attempted to flee from custody. The captain of the passenger plane refused to carry Rivera on board due to the safety concerns of other passengers. The Australian Nine Network reported that Rivera kicked out, swore, and threatened to kill his escorts. The marshals flew with a Learjet and a group of elite tactical response officers from the U.S to get Rivera back to the USA. According to some information, Rivera had to be sedated during the flight back to the USA.

Some documents written by Rivera himself during his years fighting extradition in Australia were used against him in his trial. While on the witness stand, Rivera said he "did not recognize or acknowledge" the document, in which he wrote he did not acknowledge American law or authority. During his cross-examination, Deputy District Attorney Sean Daugherty said Rivera's entire testimony is suspect due to a lack of respect for American law.

Rivera was also convicted in the death of a 3-year-old girl in Germany and was in prison four years before he returned to Barstow, California and murdered Garcia.

Rivera served in the U.S Army.  He went by the name of Lawrence J. Hale and was stationed in Hanau, Germany. He was never charged for the murder with the three year old little girl but was a prime suspect.  His 3-4 year prison term in Germany was due to many disobeying lawful orders and stalking counts.. 

Rivera began dating a local national in Germany by the name of Danielle who had a little girl. Their relationship was a love/hate relationship, Lawrence told many of his fellow service members that "she'd be perfect if it weren't for the damn kid". He killed the child while staying in the home of Danielle and her child.

Lawrence served 1–2 years in a U.S Army prison in Manheim, Germany, and was transferred to Ft. Knox. Kentucky to finish the remainder of his sentence. He then returned to California, where he was from, changed his name and began working for Raytheon.

References

American people imprisoned abroad
Prisoners and detainees of Germany
People extradited from Australia
People extradited to the United States
American people convicted of murder
American prisoners sentenced to life imprisonment
Prisoners sentenced to life imprisonment by California
People convicted of murder by California
Living people
1971 births